Don Thong is a subdistrict in the Mueang Phitsanulok District of Phitsanulok Province, Thailand.

Geography
The terrain of Don Thong is generally flat lowlands, with some hills on the eastern edge of the subdistrict.  Don Thong is bordered to the north by Ban Pa, to the east by Wang Thong District, to the south by Samo Khae and to the west by Hua Ro.  Don Thong lies in the Nan Basin, which is part of the Chao Phraya Watershed.

Administration
The following is a list of the subdistrict's muban, which roughly correspond to villages:

Temples
Wat Don Thong in Ban Don Thong hosts a 600-year-old rubber tree.
Wat Ban Rai in Ban Rai
Wat Nam Kham in Ban Nam Kham
วัดร้องยุ้งข้าว in Ban Nong Gwang Lee
วัดหนองกวางลี้ in Ban Nong Gwang Lee
วัดตาลสุวรรณ in Ban Than Suwan
Wat Sa'ak in Ban Sa'ak
วัดเขาฟ้าป่าหิมพานต์ in Ban Kao Fa
วัดเต็งสำนัก in Ban Theng Samnak
Wat Pak Huai in Ban Pak Huai
วัดลาดบัวขาว in muban 2
วัดป่าสัก (บ้านบึงถัง) in muban 3

Economy
The core of the economy of Don Thong is rice farming and raising cow and buffalo.

Education
Dong Thong Wittaya High School

Government Institutions
Two public health centers

Attractions
Huai Som Kem Lake

References

Tambon of Phitsanulok province
Populated places in Phitsanulok province